The Bakersfield Condors are a professional ice hockey team in the American Hockey League (AHL) based in Bakersfield, California. The team is owned by and affiliated with the National Hockey League's Edmonton Oilers. The Condors play their home games at Mechanics Bank Arena. The AHL franchise is a relocation of the Oklahoma City Barons, which joined four other AHL franchises in 2015 as the basis to form a new Pacific Division in California.

The Condors replaced the ECHL team of the same name, which played as a charter member of the West Coast Hockey League from 1995 until 2003 and then in the ECHL from 2003 until the end of the 2014–15 season, after which they moved to Norfolk, Virginia, to play as the Norfolk Admirals. The Condors are the only AHL team in the United States affiliated with a Canadian team.

History
On December 18, 2014, the Oklahoma City Barons and Edmonton Oilers mutually agreed to end the Barons' operations after the end of the 2014–15 season, with the Barons management citing financial problems and the Oilers citing a desire to "move on." One month later, on January 29, 2015, the AHL announced that the Oilers would relocate their franchise to Bakersfield as one of five charter members to form the basis of a new Pacific Division beginning in the 2015–16 season. A name-the-team contest was held from January 30 until February 15, 2015. The Condors name was announced as the winner on February 25, 2015. The Condors unveiled their new logo and colors on April 2, 2015.

On December 18, 2015, the Condors participated in the AHL's first outdoor game in California, called the Golden State Hockey Rush, at Raley Field in West Sacramento against the Stockton Heat. The Heat would defeat the Condors 3–2 in front of 9,357 fans. Despite not making the playoffs in their first season, the Condors still contributed to the overall increase in AHL attendance with an average of 5195 per night, an increase of about 1900 spectators compared to the former Barons and similar to the former ECHL Condors.

In the 2016–17 season, the Condors were named as hosts for their second AHL Outdoor Classic game, named the Condorstown Outdoor Classic, against the Ontario Reign held on January 7, 2017, at Bakersfield College's Memorial Stadium. Despite sometimes heavy rain, the game went on as scheduled and the Condors defeated the Reign 3–2 in overtime.

During the 2018–19 season, the Condors tied the second-longest AHL winning streak at 17 games from January 12 to February 25, 2019. The Condors finished in first place in Pacific Division in the regular season before they were eliminated in the second round of the playoffs by the San Diego Gulls.

Season-by-season results

Players

Current roster
Updated March 15, 2023.

Team captains 

 Ryan Hamilton, 2015–2018
 Keegan Lowe, 2018–2020
 Brad Malone, 2020–present

Notable alumni
List of Bakersfield Condors alumni who played more than 100 games in Bakersfield and 100 or more games in the National Hockey League.

References

External links
 

 
2015 establishments in California
1
Ice hockey teams in California
Ice hockey clubs established in 2015
Sports in Bakersfield, California
Oilers Entertainment Group